uOttawa is a light rail transit (LRT) station on the O-Train Confederation Line, located on the University of Ottawa campus.

Location

Located just east of the Rideau Canal at the western terminus of Somerset Street East, the station services the University of Ottawa's southern section and the Sandy Hill neighbourhood. A pedestrian and bicycle tunnel runs under the station, linking the university and the canal.

History
uOttawa station replaces Campus station and the nearby Laurier station, which were bus rapid transit (BRT) stations on Ottawa's Transitway that served the University of Ottawa.

Campus station was the easternmost bus station located within Ottawa's downtown core, serving mainly as a drop-off and pickup for pedestrians, especially university students and staff. Laurier station, as its name suggests, was located at the Laurier Avenue East and Waller intersection, serving the Desmarais Building for the Telfer School of Management and the Faculty of Arts.

The Corktown Footbridge over the Rideau Canal was opened in September 2006 to link the Campus station to the Golden Triangle neighbourhood east of Elgin Street.

The station became an O-Train station on the Confederation Line starting on September 14, 2019, and it was renamed uOttawa.

Layout

uOttawa is an at-grade side platform station. One entrance is located at platform level on the northeastern (westbound) side of the station; another is located in the station's underground concourse, which opens onto the public pedestrian and bicycle tunnel. The bicycle tunnel emerges as a large S-curve just north of the station.

The station has two artworks. One, Train of Thought by Derek Michael Besant, is a series of portraits located in the pedestrian/cycle tunnel, whose appearance shifts as one walks past them. The other, Sphere Field by Kenneth Emig, is a sculpture of a mirrored sphere in a glass case, and is located on the plaza just to the north of the station.

Service

The following routes serve uOttawa as of October 6, 2019:

Notes 
 Route  is available nearby at the corner of Somerset Street East and King Edward Avenue.
 Route  serves this station during peak hours only.

References

External links

University of Ottawa
Confederation Line stations
Railway stations in Canada at university and college campuses
Railway stations in Canada opened in 2019
2019 establishments in Ontario